Angela Wang (born July 30, 1996) is an American figure skater. She is the 2017 Bavarian Open champion, a three-time medalist on the ISU Challenger Series, and a three-time medalist on the ISU Junior Grand Prix (JGP) series. Her JGP medals include gold from a 2012 competition in Croatia.

Personal life 
Angela Wang, an only child, was born in Salt Lake City, Utah. Her mother, Shuyan, is an English-Mandarin translator, while her father, Laixin, is a pharmaceutical drug developer. Her parents moved from China to the United States in 1994.

Wang graduated from Cheyenne Mountain High School in 2014. She then majored in exercise science at the University of Colorado Colorado Springs.

Career
Wang began skating in 2002 because the Winter Olympics were held that year in her hometown of Salt Lake City. She made her ISU Junior Grand Prix (JGP) debut during the 2010–2011 season, placing fourth at her sole assignment, the SBC Cup held in Japan.

Wang relocated to Colorado Springs in the summer of 2011 and joined Christy Krall and Damon Allen. Competing in the 2012 JGP series, she won bronze in Lake Placid, New York and gold in Zagreb, Croatia. She qualified for the JGP Final, where she placed fourth. She was coached by Christy Krall, Damon Allen, and Janet Champion in Colorado Springs, Colorado.

The following season, Wang took silver in Gdańsk, Poland and placed fifth in Ostrava, Czech Republic, becoming the first alternate for the JGP Final. She was called up when Karen Chen withdrew and finished sixth.

Making her senior international debut, Wang medaled at two 2014–15 ISU Challenger Series events, taking bronze at the Lombardia Trophy and silver at the Autumn Classic. She placed 15th at the 2015 U.S. Championships and 10th at the 2016 U.S. Championships.

In October 2016, Wang withdrew from the 2016 Skate America due to a right ankle injury. She finished 7th at the U.S. Championships in January 2017 and won gold the following month at the Bavarian Open.

In January 2018, Wang placed 7th again at the U.S. Figure Skating Championships and was named as the third alternate for the 2018 Winter Olympics team. During the season, she was coached by Christy Krall, Ryan Bradley, and Erik Schulz in Colorado Springs, Colorado. She then relocated to Edmonton, Alberta, Canada, to be coached by Ravi Walia.

Programs

Competitive highlights 
GP: Grand Prix; CS: Challenger Series; JGP: Junior Grand Prix

2010–2011 to present

2005–2006 to 2009–2010

References

External links 

 
 Angela Wang at U.S. Figure Skating

1996 births
Living people
American female single skaters
Figure skaters from Salt Lake City
American sportspeople of Chinese descent
21st-century American women